Lenore Edna Walker is an American psychologist who founded the Domestic Violence Institute, documented the cycle of abuse and wrote The Battered Woman, published in 1979, for which she won the Distinguished Media Award that year. She was inducted into the Colorado Women's Hall of Fame in 1987.

Biography 
Lenore Edna Walker was born in New York City on October 3, 1942. She lived and worked in Denver, Colorado, where she was a licensed psychologist, was a leader in the field of domestic violence, and was president and chief executive officer of Walker & Associates. To research family violence, Walker founded the Domestic Violence Institute.

She has testified as an expert witness in trials involving domestic abuse and had developed domestic violence training programs and drafted legislative reform. Walker interviewed 1,500 women who had been subject to domestic violence and found that there was a similar pattern of abuse, called the "cycle of abuse".  She wrote the book The Battered Woman for which she won the Distinguished Media Award the same year.

In 1995, Walker testified for O. J. Simpson during his trial for the murders of his ex-wife, Nicole Brown Simpson, and her friend, Ron Goldman. Since evidence of Simpson physically abusing Brown in the past had already been shown by the prosecution, to the point that he had once been arrested and pleaded no contest for spousal abuse, Walker's colleagues accused her of betraying her advocacy for financial gain. The National Coalition Against Domestic Violence wrote of Walker's assessment of Simpson, "[it] is absolutely the opposite of the assessment of most battered women's advocates in this country." During the subsequent civil trial, Walker testified against him instead and testified for the Goldmans.

Published works 
 The Battered Woman, 1979
 Getting it All Women in the Eighties, Women and Mental Health
 The Battered Woman Syndrome

References 

American women psychologists
21st-century American psychologists
1942 births
Living people
21st-century American women
20th-century American psychologists